Vitaliy Kondrut (born 15 February 1984) is a former Ukrainian cyclist.

Palmares
2006
 National U23 Road Race Champion
3rd Gran Premio Industrie del Marmo
2007
2nd Grand Prix of Moscow
3rd Flèche du Sud
2008
1st La Roue Tourangelle
2009
3rd Volta ao Alentejo

References

1984 births
Living people
Ukrainian male cyclists